Harringay Green Lanes may refer to:
Harringay Green Lanes railway station, a railway station in the neighbourhood of Harringay
Harringay, a neighbourhood in the London Borough of Haringey sometimes incorrectly referred to as 'Harringay Green Lanes' because of the railway station.